Colobometra perspinosa is a species of echinoderm known by the common name black feather star.

The black feather star is widespread throughout the tropical waters of the central Indo-Pacific region. This feather star is often clinged to gorgonians, exposed their open arms to the marine flow to optimise the nutriment capture.

Its coloration is usually black but it can also be black and white, and even brown-gold for rare specimen.

References

External links
Colobometra perspinosa at the World Register of Marine Species

Colobometridae
Animals described in 1881